The Albert Park Circuit is a motorsport street circuit around Albert Park Lake, three kilometres south of central Melbourne. It is used annually as a circuit for the Formula One Australian Grand Prix, the supporting Supercars Championship Melbourne 400 and other associated support races. The circuit has an FIA Grade 1 license.

Although the entire track consists of normally public roads, each sector includes medium to high-speed characteristics more commonly associated with dedicated racetracks facilitated by grass and gravel run-off safety zones that are reconstructed annually. However, the circuit also has characteristics of a street circuit's enclosed nature due to concrete barriers annually built along the Lakeside Drive curve, in particular, where run-off is not available due to the proximity of the lake shore.

Design

The circuit uses everyday sections of road that circle Albert Park Lake, a small man-altered lake (originally a large lagoon formed as part of the ancient Yarra River course) just south of the Central Business District of Melbourne. The road sections that are used were rebuilt before the inaugural event in 1996 to ensure consistency and smoothness. As a result, compared to other circuits that are held on public roads, the Albert Park track has quite a smooth surface. Before 2007 there existed only a few other places on the Formula 1 calendar with a body of water close to the track. Many of the new tracks, such as Valencia, Singapore and Abu Dhabi are close to a body of water.

The course is considered to be quite fast and relatively easy to drive, drivers having commented that the consistent placement of corners allows them to easily learn the circuit and achieve competitive times. However, the flat terrain around the lake, coupled with a track design that features few true straights, means that the track is not conducive to overtaking or easy spectating unless in possession of a grandstand seat.

Each year, most of the trackside fencing, pedestrian overpasses, grandstands, and other motorsport infrastructure are erected approximately two months before the Grand Prix weekend and removed within 6 weeks after the event. The land around the circuit (including a large aquatic centre, a golf course, a Lakeside Stadium, some restaurants, and rowing boathouses) has restricted access during that entire period. Dissent is still prevalent among nearby residents and users of those other facilities, and some still maintain a silent protest against the event. Nevertheless, the event is reasonably popular in Melbourne and Australia (with a large European population and a general interest in motorsport). Middle Park, the home of South Melbourne FC was demolished in 1994 due to expansion at Albert Park.

The Grand Prix regularly draws crowds of over 270,000 spectators, with the 2022 drawing a record crowd of 419,114, including 128,294 on the main raceday. There has never been a night race at Albert Park, although the 2009 and 2010 events both started at 5:00 p.m. local time. The current contract for the Grand Prix at the circuit concludes in 2035.

Following the postponement of the Australian Grand Prix in 2021, due to the COVID-19 pandemic, the track underwent layout changes, the most notable part was the modification of the turn 9–10 complex from a heavy right-left corner to a fast-sweeping right-left corner into turns 11 and 12. Also, some corners were widened such as turn 1, turn 3, turn 6, turn 7, and turn 15; and it is expected that these modifications will reduce qualifying lap times by as much as five seconds.

Everyday access

During the nine months of the year when the track is not required for Grand Prix preparation or the race weekend, most of the track can be driven by ordinary street-registered vehicles either clockwise or anti-clockwise.

Only the sections between turns 3, 4, and 5, then 5 and 6, differ significantly from the race track configuration. Turn 4 is replaced by a car park access road running directly from turns 3 to 5. Between turns 5 and 6, the road is blocked. It is possible to drive from turn 5 on to Albert Road and back on to the track at turn 7 though three sets of lights control the flow of this option. The only set of lights on the actual track is halfway between turns 12 and 13, where drivers using Queens Road are catered for. The chicanes at turns 11 and 12 are considerably more open than that used in the Grand Prix, using the escape roads. Turn 9 is also a car park and traffic is directed down another escape road.

The back of the track, turns 7 to 13 inclusive, is known as Lakeside Drive. Double lines separate the two-way traffic along most of Lakeside Drive with short road islands approximately every  which means overtaking is illegal here. Black Swans live and breed in Albert Park, and frequently cross the road causing traffic delays, sometimes with up to five cygnets (young swans).

Approximately 80% of the track edge is lined with short parkland-style chain-linked fencing leaving normal drivers less room for error than F1 drivers have during race weekend. There is however substantial shoulder room between the outside of each lane and the fencing, which is used as parking along Aughtie Drive during the other nine months.

History

Albert Park Circuit (1953–1958)
Prior to World War II, attempts were made to use Albert Park for motor racing. The first was in 1934 but failed due to opposition, and a second attempt for a motorcycle race in 1937 similarly failed. Finally in 1953 the Light Car Club of Australia were able to secure use of the circuit for that year's Australian Grand Prix.

Albert Park is the only venue to host the Australian Grand Prix in both World Championship and non-World Championship formats with an earlier configuration of the current circuit used for the race on two occasions during the 1950s. During this time racing was conducted in an anti-clockwise direction as opposed to the current circuit which runs clockwise.

Known as the Albert Park Circuit, the original  course hosted a total of six race meetings:
 21 November 1953 – featuring the 1953 Australian Grand Prix, won by Doug Whiteford (Talbot-Lago T26C)
 26 and 27 March 1955 – the first Moomba meeting, which involved an alliance with the Moomba festival and The Argus newspaper, featuring the Moomba TT, won by Doug Whiteford (Triumph TR2) and the Argus Trophy, also won by Doug Whiteford (Talbot-Lago)

 11 March and 18 March 1956 – the second Moomba meeting, featuring the 1956 Moomba TT won by Tony Gaze (HWM Jaguar), and on the second weekend the 1956 Argus Trophy, won by Reg Hunt (Maserati 250F)
 25 November & 2 December 1956 – featuring the 1956 Australian Tourist Trophy, won by Stirling Moss (Maserati 300S), and on the second weekend the 1956 Australian Grand Prix, also won by Stirling Moss (Maserati 250F)
 17 and 24 March 1957 – the third Moomba meeting – featuring the Victorian Tourist Trophy won by Doug Whiteford (Maserati 300S), and the Victorian Trophy, won by Lex Davison (Ferrari 500). The Victorian Trophy was retrospectively designated as the second round of the 1957 Australian Drivers' Championship
 23 and 30 November 1958 – featuring the 1958 Victorian Tourist Trophy, won by Doug Whiteford (Maserati 300S), and, on the second weekend, the 1958 Melbourne Grand Prix, (a round of the 1958 Australian Drivers' Championship), won by Stirling Moss (Cooper Coventry Climax)

The November 1958 meeting was the last on the original incarnation of the circuit, as it closed shortly after.

Events

 Current
 April: Formula One Australian Grand Prix, FIA Formula 2 Championship, FIA Formula 3 Championship, Supercars Championship Melbourne 400, Porsche Carrera Cup Australia Championship

 Former

 Australian Drivers' Championship (1957–1958, 1996)
 Australian Formula 4 Championship (2019)
 Australian Formula Ford Championship (2009–2010, 2012)
 Australian GT Championship (2008–2010, 2016–2019)
 Ferrari Challenge Asia-Pacific (2018–2019)
 Porsche Supercup (1999)
 S5000 Australian Drivers' Championship (2022)
 Supercars Championship Supercars Challenge (1996–2006, 2008–2017)

Race lap records
As of 10 April 2022, the official race lap records at the Albert Park Circuit are listed as:

See also
Adelaide Street Circuit

References

External links

Albert Park at Official Formula 1 website
Melbourne Grand Prix Circuit Guide
Albert Park Melbourne Grand Prix Circuit on Google Maps (Current Formula 1 Tracks)

Motorsport venues in Victoria (Australia)
Formula One circuits
Australian Grand Prix
Sports venues in Melbourne
Streets in Melbourne
Supercars Championship circuits
1953 establishments in Australia
Sport in the City of Port Phillip